The fourth season of The Real Housewives of New Jersey, an American reality television series, was broadcast on Bravo. It aired from April 22, 2012 until October 21, 2012, and was primarily filmed in Franklin Lakes, New Jersey. Its executive producers are Rebecca Toth Diefenbach, Valerie Haselton, Lucilla D'Agostino, Jim Fraenkel, Omid Kahangi, Caroline Self, Tess Gamboa Meyers and Andy Cohen.

The Real Housewives of New Jersey focuses on the lives of Teresa Giudice, Jacqueline Laurita, Caroline Manzo, Melissa Gorga and Kathy Wakile. It consisted of twenty-four episodes.

Production and crew
The Real Housewives of New Jersey was officially renewed for a fourth season on June 7, 2011. The season premiere "High Tide, Low Blow"" was aired on April 22, 2012, while the twentieth episode "Strip Down Memory Lane" served as the season finale, and was aired on September 23, 2012. It was followed by a three-part reunion that aired on September 30, October 7 and October 14, 2012, a lost footage episode marked the conclusion of the season and was broadcast on October 21, 2012.

Rebecca Toth Diefenbach, Valerie Haselton, Lucilla D'Agostino, Jim Fraenkel, Omid Kahangi, Caroline Self, Tess Gamboa Meyers and Andy Cohen are recognized as the series' executive producers; it is produced and distributed by Sirens Media.

Cast and synopsis
The fourth season saw no regular cast changes made at the beginning of the series. The season continued with the family drama between Teresa Giudice and her family and fellow cast member Melissa Gorga and Kathy Wakile. Gorga is constantly feeling conflicted as her drama with her sister-in-law puts her husband, Joe Gorga, in a tough position. Throughout the series, friends of Teresa, Caroline Manzo and Jacqueline Laurita, begin to get to know Teresa's family and begin to see their side of things. By the end of the season Giudice is feuding with everyone. Away from the drama of Teresa's family, Gorga continues to pursue her singing career, Manzo celebrates a wedding in the family and continues to focus on being a strong mother and Kathy continues to expanding her dessert line.

 Jacqueline Laurita does not appear at this reunion.

Episodes

References

External links

2012 American television seasons
New Jersey (season 4)